So Loki is a Canadian hip hop band from Vancouver, British Columbia, consisting of rapper Sam Lucia and producer Geoffrey Millar. They are most noted for their singles "Athletes World", whose video was a longlisted Prism Prize nominee in 2019, and "Elephant Man", which was shortlisted for the SOCAN Songwriting Prize in the same year.

The band released their debut EP V in 2016, and followed up with the full-length album Shine in 2017. In 2018 they released the EP Planet Bando, which featured the songs "Athletes World" and "Elephant Man"; several months later, they also released whatever, a split EP with bbno$.

References

Canadian hip hop groups
Musical groups from Vancouver